László Puch (born 7 November 1953) is a Hungarian entrepreneur and Hungarian Socialist Party (MSZP) politician. He was a Member of Parliament between 1994 and 2014. He functioned as his party's treasurer from 1998 to 2008, becoming an influential "grey eminence" and powerful politician behind the Socialist cabinets. He served as Secretary of State for Transport, Communications and Energy from 2008 to 2010. As a businessman, he has extensive media interests with Népszava and Vasárnapi Hírek.

References

1953 births
Living people
Hungarian businesspeople
Members of the Hungarian Socialist Workers' Party
Hungarian Socialist Party politicians
Members of the National Assembly of Hungary (1994–1998)
Members of the National Assembly of Hungary (1998–2002)
Members of the National Assembly of Hungary (2002–2006)
Members of the National Assembly of Hungary (2006–2010)
Members of the National Assembly of Hungary (2010–2014)
People from Baranya County
Danube-Swabian people